"Endlessly" is a 1959 single by Brook Benton. The follow-up to his breakthrough hit "It's Just a Matter of Time", it reached number 12 on the Billboard Hot 100. Its B-side, "So Close", also reached the chart, peaking at number 38. "Endlessly" also was Benton's first chart success in the UK, where it reached #28.

In 1970, country singer Sonny James, who had topped the country charts with a remake of "It's Just a Matter of Time" earlier in the year, released his version of "Endlessly" as a single.  It was James' sixteenth number-one song on the U.S. country singles chart.  The single spent three weeks at number one and a total of fourteen weeks on the chart.

British singer Tom Jones also recorded a version, released on his 1965 debut album Along Came Jones.

Chart performance

Brook Benton

Sonny James

References

1959 singles
1970 singles
Brook Benton songs
Sonny James songs
Songs written by Brook Benton
Songs written by Clyde Otis
Mercury Records singles
Capitol Records singles
1959 songs